Rotor may refer to:

Science and technology

Engineering
Rotor (electric), the non-stationary part of an alternator or electric motor, operating with a stationary element so called the stator
Helicopter rotor, the rotary wing(s) of a rotorcraft such as a helicopter
ROTOR, a former radar project in the UK following the Second World War
Rotor (turbine), the rotor of a turbine powered by fluid pressure
Rotor (crank), a variable-angle bicycle crank
Rotor (brake), the disc of a disc brake, in U.S. terminology
Rotor (brake mechanism), a device that allows the handlebars and fork to revolve indefinitely without tangling the rear brake cable - see Detangler
Rotor (distributor), a component of the ignition system of an internal combustion engine
Pistonless rotary engine
Rotor (antenna)

Computing
Rotor machine, the rotating wheels used in certain cipher machines, such as the German Enigma machine
 Rotor (Enigma machine), a rotating part of the German Enigma machine
Rotor (software project), the former code name for Microsoft's shared source implementation of its Common Language Infrastructure

Chemistry
 The rotating part of a centrifuge, which also holds the samples
 Rigid rotor, a mathematical model for rotating systems (usually molecules)

Medicine

 Rotor syndrome, a rare liver disorder

Mathematics
Rotor (mathematics), an even-graded multivector used to produce rotations and some other affine transformations
Curl (mathematics), known as rotor in some countries, a vector operator that shows a vector field's rate of rotation

Other uses
SC Rotor Volgograd, a Russian football club
Rotor (Sonic the Hedgehog), a fictional character from the Sonic the Hedgehog universe 
Rotor (ride), the trade name for an amusement ride
Rotor (meteorology), a turbulent horizontal vortex that forms in the trough of lee waves
Rotor, a space colony in Isaac Asimov's novel Nemesis
R.O.T.O.R., a 1987 science fiction/action movie